The Italian basketball league system or Italian basketball league pyramid, is a series of interconnected competitions for professional basketball clubs in Italy. The system has a hierarchical format with a promotion and demotion system between competitions at different levels. There are currently nine different competitions on the pyramid: the 1st-tier Lega Basket Serie A (LBA), the 2nd-tier Serie A2 Basket, the 3rd-tier Serie B Basket, the 4th-tier Serie C Gold Basket, the 5th-tier Serie C Regionale, the 6th-tier Serie D Regionale, the 7th-tier Promozione, the 8th-tier Prima Divisione, and the 9th-tier Seconda Divisione.

The tier pyramid

Other competitions
Italian Cup
Italian Supercup
Italian Legadue Cup

See also
League system
European professional club basketball system
Spanish basketball league system
Greek basketball league system
French basketball league system
Russian basketball league system
Turkish basketball league system
Serbian basketball league system
Polish basketball league system
Hungarian basketball league system
South American professional club basketball system

References

External links
Eurobasket.com Italian Men's Basketball
Italian League Official Website 
Italian Second Division Official Website 

Basketball league systems